Christopher Turner may refer to:
 Christopher J. Turner (1933–2014), Governor of the Turks and Caicos and of Montserrat
 Christopher Turner, British writer
 Kristopher Turner (born 1980), Canadian actor
 Christopher Turner (photographer), husband of writer Armistead Maupin

See also
Chris Turner (disambiguation)
Christopher Turnor (disambiguation)